The Chaffee County Poor Farm, near Salida, Colorado, was established in 1891.  It was listed on the National Register of Historic Places in 1985.  The listing included three contributing buildings.

Its buildings were built in 1892 by Buena Vista, Colorado contractors Lawrence Bros.

It is located at 8495 County Road 160.

References

Poor farms
National Register of Historic Places in Chaffee County, Colorado
Colonial Revival architecture in Colorado
Buildings and structures completed in 1891